Maylandia fainzilberi is a species of cichlid endemic to Lake Malawi.  It can reach a length of  TL.  It can also be found in the aquarium trade. The honours the tropical fish dealer Misha Fainzilber who helped the author, Wolfgang Staeck, gain access to Lake Malawi.

References

Taxa named by Wolfgang Staeck
Fish described in 1976
fainzilberi
Taxonomy articles created by Polbot
Taxobox binomials not recognized by IUCN